William Parra may refer to:

 William Parra (journalist) (born 1966), Colombian journalist
 William Parra (footballer) (born 1995), Colombian footballer